Lavasan (also Romanized as Lavāsān) is a city in Lavasanat District of Shemiranat County, Tehran province, Iran, and serves as capital of the district and county. At the 2006 census, its population was 15,448 in 4,645 households. The following census in 2011 counted 15,706 people in 5,033 households. The latest census in 2016 showed a population of 18,146 people in 6,130 households.

The Jajrood River flows through the resort city of Lavasan, creating Latian Dam Lake on the southeast of the city. It is situated 11 kilometers northeast of Tehran. The highrise scenery around Lavasan (with many peaks above 3000 meters) attracts lots of campers and cyclists. The city is accessed by two double lane roads (from Tajrish and Tehranpars) adjoining each other on 1930 meters Quchak Pass, then on a whirling double lane road, down to Jajrood River and Lavasan on its north bank on 1700m.

Etymology
The name of Lavasan is a Middle Persian (Pahlavi) word which means "The Mount Blade of Sunrise" or "Mountaintop of Sunrise". It refers to Mount Damavand that is located in the middle Alborz Range in the east of Lavasanat District.

History
In the 19th century, during the Qajar era, Lavasan was reportedly a large village, with some 500 houses and about 200 inhabitants. It became well known during the war of the cities when many people from Tehran took refuge in the nearby towns such as Lavasan.

The two most influential parts of Lavasan are Great Lavasan (Lavasan Bozorg) and Little Lavasan (Lavasan Koochak). While the Great Lavasan was more vibrant in the early 1950s due to its location as a trade hub, the Little Lavasan has become more populated in the past few decades. Until the construction of Road 59 (Chalous Road) and other routes to the North of Iran, Great Lavasan was a thriving city on a trade path between Tehran and the North of Iran with several prominent families owning and managing the Lar Karvansara in the (now nationalized) Lar National Park, and who were active in trades of rice and production of honey among other products, hence the name "Great Lavasan". In the early 1900s Great Lavasan was home to several affluent families and traders with many unique and thriving orchards. Currently Great Lavasan is less populated than the Little Lavasan due to more restricted construction regulations, as well as an influx of new residents moving to Little Lavasan from other cities. Great Lavasan has access from the Jajrood road while the Little Lavasan has access from behind the Latian Dam, their different areas include Saboo Bozorg, Saboo Koochak, Tork Mahale, Seied Paiz, etc.

Under Mohammad Reza Pahlavi, in the 1960s, a hydroelectric dam was built in the southeast of the village which is nowadays one of the water supplies of Tehran.

People
The natives of Lavasan are of Caspian origin. The local dialect or "vernacular" spoken by its natives is a mix of Persian and Caspian.

Geography 

Lavasan is located 11 kilometres northeast of Tehran on the slopes of Alborz with an area of 70 square kilometres.
The city of Lavasan is the capital of Lavasanat district. Together with Rudbar-e Qasran district and Shemiran, it constitutes Shemiranat County in Tehran Province.

Climate
Lavasan has a cold semi-arid climate (Köppen climate classification: BSk) with significant continental influences.

People
The natives of Lavasan are of Caspian origin. The local dialect or "vernacular" spoken by its natives is a mix of Persian and Caspian.

Notable residents
 Yasser Hashemi Rafsanjani
 Ali Karimi
 Ali Parvin
Amin Hayaee
 Naser Houshmand Vaziri

Gallery

See also
 Shemiranat
 Lavasanat
 Jajrood River
 Latyan Dam
 Fasham
 Shemshak

References

Sources
 

Shemiranat County

Cities in Tehran Province

Populated places in Tehran Province

Populated places in Shemiranat County